The retroflex nasal click is a rare click consonant. There is no symbol for it in the International Phonetic Alphabet.

Features
Features of the retroflex nasal click:

Occurrence
Retroflex nasal clicks are only attested from two languages, Central !Kung and Damin.

Glottalized alveolar nasal click

All Khoisan languages have glottalized nasal clicks. These are formed by closing the glottis so that the click is pronounced in silence; however, any preceding vowel will be nasalized.

References

Nasal consonants
Palatal consonants
Click consonants
Central consonants
Voiced consonants